Adams Musical Instruments is a manufacturer of musical instruments based in the Netherlands. The company produces percussion and brass instruments.

Percussion instruments by Adams include timpani, marimbas, xylophones, vibraphones, glockenspiels, bar chimes, bass drums, bell plates, temple blocks and drum hardware, while range of brass instruments include trumpets, flugelhorns, cornets, trombones, euphoniums, and tubas.

History 
André Adams, founder of the company, started repairing brass instruments in 1970. Music was his hobby, and engineering was his passion. After gaining experience as an instrument maker with various well-known firms throughout Europe, his unique background led to the emergence of one of the world’s largest manufacturers of percussion- and brass instruments.

Cooperation 
Adams Musical Instruments has expanded due to the fact that they have been in partnerships with the following: 
professional musicians
amateur musicians
several universities

Awards 
Adams Musical Instruments has received the following awards:
Limburg Export Award
King William 1 award

Location 
The instrument factories and headquarters of the company are based in Ittervoort, Netherlands. In the same building Adams has a huge music shop for woodwind, brasswind, drums and percussion. In Lummen (Belgium) the company has another music shop. Both stores have a specialised repair department. The instruments are sold worldwide via dealers and distributors. In the US through Pearl Drums for instance. Some notable dealers of Adams trumpets and flugel horns in the US are Austin Custom Brass and J. Landress Brass.

References

External links 
 Official website

Percussion instrument manufacturing companies
Brass instrument manufacturing companies
Musical instrument manufacturing companies of the Netherlands
Companies based in Limburg (Netherlands)